Lathraeodiscus is a genus of fungi in the family Pyronemataceae. It is monotypic, containing the single species Lathraeodiscus arcticus. This species has been found in the lowland high-arctic areas of Greenland and in Svalbard, Norway.

References

Pyronemataceae
Monotypic Ascomycota genera
Fungi of Europe
Taxa named by Henry Dissing